Flutlicht is the artist name of Swiss trance music producers Daniel Heinzer (also known as DJ Natron) and Marco Guardia (also known as Reverb).
The two are most famous for their song Icarus, which came out on Drizzly Records in 2001. It was signed to over 150 compilations (over 3 million CDs) throughout the world. Their remixes were very sought after before Marco decided to quit producing trance in 2003. Mixes were produced for The Thrillseekers, Cosmic Gate, Talla 2XLC, and G&M Project, to name a few.
Their style is a kind of harder trance.

Artist Background
Flutlicht are two young producers from Winterthur, Switzerland: Daniel Heinzer and Marco Guardia. Daniel being Flutlicht's public face whilst Marco the technical mastermind behind their productions.

Daniel started deejaying about ten years ago at little events or in tiny Swiss clubs and ever since his passion for electronic music has grown stronger every day. His style of performing high quality trance and groovy techno has earned him a good reputation and as a result he has been booked for events such as Futurescope, Nautilus, Energy or Nature One in Germany.
Daniel toured the UK, the Netherlands, Scotland and Australia.

Flutlicht started with the single "Icarus", Drizzly Records 2001, licensed for more than 150 compilations worldwide. It was followed by "The Fall" in 2003.

Daniel was a frequent guest at radio shows in Norway, Sweden, Germany, Australia, South Africa, Israel, the US and Spain. His set at the Ministry of Sound at Rotation in London is well known.
Ever since the success with "Icarus", Flutlicht remixes are very much sought after. Acts such as Cosmic Gate, Talla 2XLC, the Thrillseekers or S.H.O.K.K. have gained a great deal from the filigree studiowork of Flutlicht.

Marco Guardia and Daniel Heinzer are no longer part of Flutlicht after quitting the project in 2003.

Singles 
 Flutlicht – "The Fall", 2002
 Flutlicht – "Icarus", 2001
 Flutlicht – "Ahmea", 2000
 Flutlicht – "Mutterkorn", 2000
 Flutlicht – "Das Siegel", 1999

Remixes 
 DuMonde – "God Music" (Flutlicht Remix), 2003
 DJ Tatana – "Moments" (Flutlicht Remix), 2003
 G&M Project – "Control Of Your Mind", 2003
 Dream – "Get Over" (Flutlicht Remix), 2002
 Ian Van Dahl – "Will I?" (Flutlicht Remix), 2002
 Cosmic Gate – "Raging" (Flutlicht Remix), 2002
 The Freak – "The Melody, The Sound" (Flutlicht Remix), 2002
 The Thrillseekers – "Dreaming Of You" (Flutlicht Remix), 2002
 Green Court Feat. Lina Rafn – "Silent Heart" (Flutlicht Remix), 2002
 Talla 2XLC – "Can You Feel The Silence" (Flutlicht Remix), 2002
 The Mystery – "Devotion" (Flutlicht Remix), 2002
 Marc Dawn – "Expander" (Flutlicht Remix), 2002
 Sumatra – "Reincarnation" (Flutlicht Remix), 2002
 S.H.O.K.K. – "Isn't It All A Little Strange" (Flutlicht Remix), 2001
 Alex Bartlett – "Amnesia" (Flutlicht vs. S.H.O.K.K. Remix), 2001
 DJ Air – "Alone With Me" (Flutlicht Remix), 2001
 Native – "Feel The Drums" (Flutlicht Remix), 2001
 Tony Walker – "Fields Of Joy" (Flutlicht Remix), 2000

External links 
 Flutlicht on discogs.com
 Official Flutlicht Facebook page
 Official Flutlicht-site
 Official Studio-site

Trance music groups
Swiss electronic music groups